A list of films produced in Brazil in 1941:

See also
 1941 in Brazil

External links
Brazilian films of 1941 at the Internet Movie Database

Brazil
1941
Films